Teodoro de Ardemans or Ardmans (ca. 1661–1726) was a Spanish architect and painter.

Ardemans was born in Madrid to a German father.

He was a disciple of the painter Claudio Coello, although he mainly practiced architecture; the municipality of Toledo named him master of the Cathedral of Toledo. In 1702, King Philip V of Spain named him to succeed  José del Olmo as the master for Royal works, and in 1704 as their chamber painter. He worked on the extensive renovations of the Palace of Aranjuez, including completing the facade to a design of Francisco Herrera. He also helped in the decoration of the Palace of la Granja de San Ildefonso, including the chapel.

Bibliography 

Noticias de los arquitectos y arquitectura de España desde su restauración. Eugenio Llaguno y Amirola y Juan Agustín Ceán Bermúdez, Madrid 1829. digital version
Aterido Fernández, Ángel, Teodoro Ardemans, pintor, Anuario del Departamento de Historia y Teoría del Arte, (UAM), vol. VII-VIII, 1995–1996, p. 133-148.

18th-century Spanish architects
18th-century Spanish painters
18th-century Spanish male artists
Spanish male painters
Spanish Baroque painters
1726 deaths
Year of birth unknown
Spanish people of German descent
Year of birth uncertain